Thingdawlte Tlang is a mountain in Bangladesh. It is the highest point of the Lowmbok Row range and possibly the country's 7th tallest. In December 2012 local explorer Fahim Hasan of BD Explorer summited the peak and measured its height for the first time. The name of the peak was collected by BD Explorer and confirmed by the local residents. The easiest summit route is to start from Ruma of Bandarban district. The nearest settlement is Thingdawlte (Bawm) village, for which the peak is named.

See also
 Geography of Bangladesh
 List of countries by highest point
 List of mountains of Bangladesh

References

Mountains of Bangladesh